Tete is the French word for head.

Tete may also refer to:
Tête de Moine, a type of Swiss cheese
Tete Province, a province of Mozambique
Tété (born 1975), a French musician
Tetê (born 2000), a Brazilian footballer
Tete Montoliu (1933–1997), a Spanish jazz pianist
Tete!, an album by Tete Montoliu

See also
Tête (disambiguation)
Tête à Tête (disambiguation)